Jórunn Viðar (7 December 1918 – 27 February 2017) was an Icelandic pianist and composer.

Biography
Jórunn Viðar was born and grew up in Reykjavík, Iceland. In 1937 she graduated from Reykjavík Grammar School, and the same year travelled to Germany to study for two years at the Music Academy in Berlin. She returned to Iceland and married Lárus Fjeldsted (1918–1985). In 1946 the family spent some time in New York City where she studied composition at the Juilliard School of Music; after they moved back to Iceland, Jórunn worked as a pianist and accompanist. She was awarded the Order of the Falcon, Knight's Cross class (Riddarakross), for accomplishments in music.

Works
Jórunn Viðar has written a number of compositions based on Icelandic folk songs. She also composed music for the film Síðasti bærinn í dalnum (The last farm in the valley). Selected works include:

Gestaboð um nótt (Text: Einar Bragi Sigurðsson)
Glugginn (Text: Halldór Kiljan Laxness)
Hvítur hestur í tunglskini (Text: Aðalsteinn Kristmundsson)
Im Kahn (Text: Cäsar Flaischlen)
Júnímorgunn (Text: Tómas Guðmundsson)
Kall sat undir kletti (Text: Halldóra B. Björnsson)
Mamma ætlar að sofna (Text: Davið Stefansson)
Sönglað á göngu (Text: Valgarður Egilsson)
Þjóðvísa (Text: Tómas Guðmundsson)
Únglíngurinn í skóginum (Text: Halldór Kiljan Laxness)
Varpaljóð á Hörpu (Text: Jakobína Sigurðardóttir)
Við Kínafljót (Text: Þorgeir Sveinbjarnarson)
Vökuró (Text: Jakobína Sigurðardóttir)  (covered by Björk on her album Medúlla)
Vorljóð á Ýli (Text: Jakobína Sigurðardóttir)
Það á að gefa börnum brauð (Text: Unknown)
Vort líf (Text: Aðalsteinn Kristmundsson)

Some of her compositions have been recorded and issued on CD, including:
Vidar - Orchestral Works (2003) Smekkleysa, ASIN: B0000D9Y6S
Tapestry of Dreams (2003) Smekkleysa, ASIN: B0000AQVMO

References

1918 births
2017 deaths
20th-century classical composers
Women classical composers
Jorunn Vidar
Jorunn Vidar
Juilliard School alumni
20th-century women composers
Icelandic expatriates in Germany
Icelandic expatriates in the United States